Ginés García Perán (born 28 February 1941) is a Spanish former professional road cyclist.

Major results

1962
 1st Clásica a los Puertos de Guadarrama
 3rd Overall Volta a Catalunya
1963
 1st Stage 10 Tour de l'Avenir
1964
 3rd Overall Tour de l'Avenir
1965
 4th Overall Volta a Catalunya
 8th Overall Critérium du Dauphiné Libéré
1966
 2nd Prueba Villafranca de Ordizia
 3rd National Road Race Championships
 5th Overall Volta a Catalunya
1967
 1st  Overall Vuelta a los Valles Mineros
1st Stage 2
 2nd GP Navarra
 2nd National Hill Climb Championships
 3rd National Road Race Championships
 4th Overall Volta a Catalunya
 5th Grand Prix du Midi Libre

References

External links
 

1941 births
Living people
Spanish male cyclists
People from Puerto Lumbreras
Cyclists from the Region of Murcia